Ohio Township is a township in Madison County, Iowa, in the United States.

History
Ohio Township was organized in 1857. A majority of the early settlers being natives of Ohio caused the name to be selected.

References

Townships in Madison County, Iowa
Townships in Iowa
1857 establishments in Iowa